JWH-398 is an analgesic chemical from the naphthoylindole family, which acts as a cannabinoid agonist at both the CB1 and CB2 receptors. It has mild selectivity for CB1 with a Ki of 2.3 nM and 2.8 nM at CB2. This synthetic chemical compound was identified by the EMCDDA as an ingredient in three separate "herbal incense" products purchased from online shops between February to June 2009. It was discovered by, and named after, John W. Huffman.

In the United States, JWH-398 is a Schedule I controlled substance.

See also
 5F-JWH-398
 JWH-122
 JWH-424

References

Naphthoylindoles
JWH cannabinoids
Chloroarenes
Designer drugs
CB1 receptor agonists
CB2 receptor agonists